Prakash Sharma Poudel is a member of 2nd Nepalese Constituent Assembly. He won Baglung–2 seat in CA assembly, 2013 from Nepali Congress. He was defeated in the December 2017 election.

References

Nepali Congress politicians from Gandaki Province
Living people
Year of birth missing (living people)
Members of the 2nd Nepalese Constituent Assembly